Theistareykjarbunga (Þeistareykjarbunga) is a shield volcano in northeastern Iceland with two fissure vents called Þeistareykjahraun  and Borgahraun , and two cones: the 370-metre Stórahversmór  and the 540-metre-high, 30-km3 Stóravíti . They both are currently extinct.

Eruptions
There have been three dated eruptions, all VEI-0: the most recent eruption was around 900 BCE and the previous eruption was in 6800 BCE.  Around 9500 BCE, an eruption produced approximately 18 billion cubic metres of basaltic lava.

See also
 List of volcanoes in Iceland

References

Shield volcanoes of Iceland
North Volcanic Zone of Iceland
Polygenetic shield volcanoes
Volcanic systems of Iceland
Calderas of Iceland
Central volcanoes of Iceland